Hamman is a surname. Notable people with the surname include:

 Adalbert Hamman (1910–2000), French Franciscan priest 
 Bob Hamman (born 1938), American professional bridge player
 Edouard Hamman (1819–1888), Belgian painter
 Jared Hamman (born 1982)
 John Hamman (1927–2000)
 Louis Virgil Hamman (1877–1946), American medical researcher
 Hamman-Rich syndrome
 Hamman's sign
 Hamman's syndrome
 Mary Hamman (1907–1984)
 Petra Hamman (born 1946)
 Phillip Hamman (c. 1753 – 1832)
 Shane Hamman (born 1972), American weightlifter

See also
 Hamam (disambiguation)